The Squadron A Armory is a former United States Army armory and was the home base of Squadron A. It took up the whole block between Madison Avenue and Park Avenue, between 94th and 95th Street. It was therefore also known as the Madison Avenue Armory.  A surviving part of the building is listed on the National Register of Historic Places as Madison Avenue Facade of the Squadron A Armory and is a New York City landmark.

A stone plaque with the squadron's cry "Boutez en avant!", translated variously as "Press forward!" or simply "Charge!", is located on the wall at Madison Avenue.

History 

The building was built in 1895 by a New York City contractor named John F. Johnson. It was constructed with red bricks, featuring massive walls with towers. It also included about 100 horse stalls to house Squadron A's horses.

The building was partially demolished in the 1960s; however, an emergency action from the New York City Landmarks Preservation Commission, which designated it a landmark, stopping the demolition of the Madison Avenue facade. That facade was later added to the National Register of Historic Places in 1972. When the eastern building was rebuilt, it was done in a style similar to the original.

Usage 

Today, the eastern and central part of the site are used by Hunter College High School and Elementary School as the schools' main campus. The outline of some of the former walls is lined with trees.

See also 
 List of armories and arsenals in New York City and surrounding counties
 Seventh Regiment Armory

References

External links 

 Squadron A Armory Ruins and Hunter College High School The City Review

1895 establishments in New York City
Armories in New York City
Government buildings completed in 1895
Government buildings on the National Register of Historic Places in Manhattan
Hunter College
Infrastructure completed in 1895
Madison Avenue
New York City Designated Landmarks in Manhattan
Upper East Side